Kanattampuliyur Pathanchalinathar Temple  (கானாட்டம்புலியூர் பதஞ்சலிநாதர் கோயில்) is a Hindu temple located at Kanattampuliyur in Cuddalore district of Tamil Nadu, India.  The historical name of the place is Tirukanattumullur.  The presiding deity is Shiva. He is called as Patanjaleeswarar. His consort is known as Kola Valai Kai Ambicai.

Significance 
It is one of the shrines of the 275 Paadal Petra Sthalams - Shiva Sthalams glorified in the early medieval Tevaram poems by Tamil Saivite Nayanar Sundarar. It is believed to be the place where sage Patanjali lived. The temple is counted as one of the temples built on the northern banks of River Kaveri.

Nava Puliyur Temples
This is one of the Nava Puliyur Temples worshipped by Patanjali and Vyaghrapada. The following temples are called as Nava Puliyur Temples.

 Perumpatrapuliyur 
 Thirupathiripuliyur 
 Erukathampuliyur 
 Omampuliyur 
 Sirupuliyur  
 Atthippuliyur  
 Thaplampuliyur   
 Perumpuliyur 
 Kanattampuliyur

Literary mention 
Sundarar describes the feature of the deity as:

References

External links 
 
 

Shiva temples in Cuddalore district
Padal Petra Stalam